Doctor Hormone is a fictional character created by Bob Bugg, who briefly appeared in comic books published by Dell Comics in the 1940s. Popular culture historian Ron Goulart calls him "one of the truly wacky creations of comics."

Publication history
Doctor Hormone first appeared in Popular Comics #54 (Aug 1940), and his adventures ran until issue #60 (Feb 1941).

Fictional character biography
Doctor Hormone was an elderly scientist who, having discovered the secret of life itself, injected himself with a "youth hormone" which restored his body to youthful vigor.  After agents from Urasia stole his formulas from his laboratory to aid in their nation's wars against its neighbors, Doctor Hormone and his granddaughter Jane traveled to the besieged nation of Novoslavia, where he used his scientific expertise to help battle the Urasian invaders, who were using the hormones to create armies of part animal/part human men.  Later, Doctor Hormone was employed as a researcher for the United States Army and worked in a laboratory at Fort Knox.

Doctor Hormone was later summoned by a disembodied voice called the Thinker who temporarily endowed him with superhuman powers to fight off an invasion of Texas by the Nazians. 

Towards the end of his run, Doctor Hormone discovered that the Ku Klux Klan were acting as a fifth column for the Nazians. He and Jane were tied to burning crosses, but they were freed by the Five Fleamen.

In the final chapter, the Thinker brought Hormone and Jane to his headquarters, in the primordial chaos. They fell into a state of suspended animation, and were never seen again.

Powers and abilities
Doctor Hormone was a scientific genius who developed powerful "hormones" which were capable of creating great changes in the human body, including restoring youth and transforming people into animals or bizarre human-animal hybrids.

The Thinker endowed Doctor Hormone with powers that included superhuman strength, a stentorian voice, and super-breath.

Footnotes

References
Doctor Hormone Profile at Comic Vine

Golden Age superheroes
Fictional physicians
Fictional scientists in comics
Dell Comics characters